Matías de los Santos may refer to:

 Matías de los Santos (footballer, born 1992), Uruguayan centre-back
 Matías de los Santos (footballer, born 1998), Uruguayan midfielder